The Plain White Banner was one of the Eight Banners of Manchu military and society during the Later Jin and Qing dynasty of China. It was one of the three "upper" banners (Plain Yellow Banner, Bordered Yellow Banner, and Plain White Banner) directly controlled by the emperor, as opposed to the other five "lower" banners.  The Hoise Niru was a military unit associated with the Plain White Banner.

Notable Members
 Dorgon
 Dodo
 Duanfang
 John Kuan
 Ronglu 
 Yinchang
 Nergingge
 Empress Xiaoshurui
 Youlan (Gūwalgiya)
 Consort Donggo
 Consort Dun
 Minggatu (Mongol)
 Imperial Noble Consort Chunhui (Han)
  (a descendant of Yuan Chonghuan) (Han)

Notable clans 

 Donggo
 Feimo
 Hitara
 Gūwalgiya
 Tohoro
 Su
 Cao
 Hu'erlate
 Yehe Nara
 Tubot
 Gobulo
 Ilari
 Zhu
 Chen
 Bai
 Yuan
Wang
Namdulu

References

Bibliography